Sophie Anita Treadwell (October 3, 1885 – February 20, 1970) was an American playwright and journalist of the first half of the 20th century. She is best known for her play Machinal which is often included in drama anthologies as an example of an expressionist or modernist play. Treadwell wrote dozens of plays, several novels, as well as serial stories and countless articles that appeared in newspapers. In addition to writing plays for the theatre, Treadwell also produced, directed and acted in some of her productions. The styles and subjects of Treadwell's writings are vast, but many present women's issues of her time, subjects of current media coverage, or aspects of Treadwell's Mexican heritage.

Heritage and childhood
Sophie Anita Treadwell was born in 1885 in Stockton, California. Between 1890 and 1891, Treadwell's father, Alfred Treadwell, deserted her and her mother, Nettie Fairchild Treadwell, and moved to San Francisco. Although Treadwell originally excelled at school, after her father left she struggled, which others have attributed to the frequency with which she and her mother relocated. While Treadwell primarily lived with her mother, occasionally Treadwell would spend summers in San Francisco with her father. During these visits, Treadwell was first exposed to theatre; she witnessed famous actresses Helena Modjeska and Sarah Bernhardt in The Merchant of Venice and Phèdre, respectively. In 1902, Treadwell and her mother moved to San Francisco.

Although Treadwell's father was also born in Stockton, CA, he spent most of his formative years in Mexico with his native-born mother. Both Treadwell's paternal grandmother and great-grandmother were Mexican women of Spanish descent. Treadwell's father had a Catholic education and was fluent in five languages. Treadwell's strong female role model was her grandmother Anna Gray Fairchild, a Scottish immigrant, who managed the family's large ranch in Stockton after the death of her husband. Traces of Treadwell's heritage—both Mexican and European can be gleaned from her works, as can references to her parents' troubled marriage and her time spent at the ranch in Stockton.

University and early career

Treadwell received her Bachelor of Letters in French from the University of California at Berkeley, where she studied from 1902 to 1906. At Berkeley, Treadwell became very involved with the school's extracurricular drama and journalism activities, serving as the college's correspondent for The San Francisco Examiner. Due to financial pressure, Treadwell had to work several jobs during her studies; receiving additional training in shorthand and typing, teaching English as a second language in the evenings, as well as working in the circulation department of the San Francisco Call. It was also during this time that she first began to write; early drafts of shorter plays, songs, and short fictional stories. During college, Treadwell had her first brushes with mental illness, a variety of nervous conditions that would plague her and lead to several extended hospitalizations throughout her life.

After college, Treadwell moved to Los Angeles where she worked for a brief time as a vaudeville singer. She then studied acting and was mentored by renowned Polish actress Helena Modjeska, whose memoirs she was hired to write in 1908. In 1910, Treadwell married William O. McGeehan, better known as 'Mac', a beloved sports writer for the San Francisco Bulletin.

New York
In 1915, Treadwell moved to New York, following her husband who had already made the cross-country move for his career. In New York, Treadwell joined the Lucy Stone League of suffragists. Treadwell participated in a 150-mile march with the League, which delivered a petition on women's suffrage to the legislature of New York. Treadwell maintained a separate residence from her husband, an idea encouraged by the League. Her marriage was said to be one of mutual independence and acceptance of differing interests.

In New York, Treadwell befriended and became associated with many well known modernist personalities and modern artists of the time, notably Louise and Walter Arensberg who ran a New York Salon, and painter Marcel Duchamp. Congruous with Treadwell's advocacy for sexual independence, birth control rights, and increased sexual freedom for women, Treadwell had a brief affair with the artist Maynard Dixon between 1916 and 1919.

Treadwell reached the peak of her professional career in journalism and in theatre in New York in the 1920s. Treadwell attended lectures and completed an extensive study with Richard Boleslavsky of the Moscow Art Theatre which proved to be both influential and motivational for Treadwell's varied theatrical pursuits. Treadwell underwent media controversy in the mid-20s for a drawn out dispute with the famous John Barrymore; Barrymore attempted to produce a play about Edgar Allan Poe supposedly written by his wife Michael Strange, which borrowed heavily from a manuscript that Treadwell had written and shared with him years prior. Treadwell brought a lawsuit against Barrymore for stoppage of the play and won, although she was criticized heavily in the media.

Treadwell lectured and advocated openly for authors rights and was the first American playwright to win royalty payments for a play production from the Soviet Union. In addition to her accomplishments, Treadwell traveled often with 'Mac' across the United States, Europe, and Northern Africa. Treadwell's husband died in 1933 due to heart complications, while they were on vacation in the state of Georgia.

Broadway
Treadwell set herself apart from many female writers of her day, by pursuing commercial productions of her works on Broadway. Seven of Treadwell's plays, listed below, appeared on the Great White Way between 1922 and 1941. Gringo was Treadwell's first play to be produced on Broadway. Most of these plays were only written by Treadwell, but she also produced Lone Valley and O, Nightingale, the later of which she even staged. New York became the setting for the majority of Treadwell's plays.
 Gringo
 O Nightingale
 Machinal
 Ladies Leave
 Lone Valley
 Plumes in the Dust
 Hope for a Harvest
Critics often negatively judged Treadwell's plays as having poorly developed plots, unsympathetic characters, or objectionable themes. Treadwell was also known for having tense relationships with producers because she was reluctant to accept their feedback and edit her work.

Later years
In the 1950s and 60's Treadwell turned to writing mostly fiction in the form of short stories and novels, which may be influenced by the lack of success from her Broadway ventures. Treadwell lived for a time as an expatriate in Vienna, Austria as well as in Torremolinos in Southern Spain. When Sophie returned to the U.S. she lived in Newton, Connecticut, but also spent time in Mexico and Stockton. In 1949, Treadwell adopted a young German boy, whom she named William.  Sophie retired in the mid-60s to Tucson, Arizona where she spent her final years. After a brief hospital stay, Treadwell died on February 20, 1970.

Plays and novels
Treadwell is credited with writing at least 39 plays, numerous serials and journalistic articles, short stories, and several novels. The subjects of her writings are as diverse as the mediums she was writing in. Many of Treadwell's works are difficult to obtain and the majority of her plays have not previously been produced.

Many of Treadwell's plays follow the traditional late nineteenth century well-made play structure, but some share the more modern style and feminist concerns Treadwell is known for, including her often anthologized Machinal. Although Treadwell's plays primarily feature lead female characters, the women presented vary greatly in their behavior, beliefs, and social status. Some of Treadwell's plays contain hints of autobiography from Treadwell's heritage to her extra-marital affair. Below is a chronological chart of her known works.

Plays and novels

Journalism
Treadwell's first job as a journalist was with the San Francisco Bulletin, where she was hired in 1908 as a feature writer and theatre critic. She interviewed celebrities, such as Jack London, and covered several high-profile murder trials. Later, when living in New York, Treadwell covered the murder trials of Ruth Snyder and Judd Gray whose stories influenced subsequent plays. Treadwell also wrote two popular serial stories for the Bulletin, one based on Treadwell's under cover research about charity available to women in need for which Treadwell disguised herself as a homeless prostitute, the other was a fiction titled How I Got My Husband and How I Lost Him which provided the source material for her later play Sympathy.

Treadwell traveled to France to cover the First World War; she was the only female foreign correspondent writing from overseas at that time, accredited by the State Department. Because Treadwell was not permitted access to the front lines, she volunteered as a nurse and focused her writing on the effect the war was having on the women in Europe. In 1915, Harper's Weekly published her feature Women in Black.

When Sophie returned to New York, she was hired by the New York American, later renamed  New York Herald Tribune where she wrote as a journalist and served as an expert on Mexican-American relations and Mexico. In 1920, Sophie covered the end of the Mexican revolution and wrote a front page piece on the flight of Mexican President Don Venustiano Carranza. In 1921, she was the only foreign journalist permitted to interview Pancho Villa. That two-day interview gained Treadwell notoriety in the journalism field as well as provided a basis for Sophie's first Broadway play Gringo and her later novel Lusita.  In 1941, Sophie spent ten months in Mexico City as a correspondent for the Tribune. Years later, Treadwell wrote for the Tribune about her visit to post-war Germany.

Contemporaries and context
Although Treadwell was writing during the height of the Little Theatre Movement in the United States, her desire to produce her works on Broadway for mainstream audiences set her apart from her contemporaries. Treadwell was only peripherally involved in the movement through her work at the Provincetown Players during their early existence.

Noteworthy women playwrights writing in the same era as Treadwell are:
Zoe Akins
Djuna Barnes
Rachel Crothers
Zona Gale
Alice Gerstenberg
Susan Glaspell
Georgia Douglas Johnson
Edna St. Vincent Millay
Gertrude Stein

Through the use of various 'isms' these playwrights explored new and alternative ways of presenting women's lives in their plays.

Treadwell remained widely unknown and un-talked about in the world of theatre scholarship until select feminist scholars resuscitated interest in her works following revivals of Machinal in 1990 by the New York Shakespeare Festival and in 1993 by the Royal National Theatre in London.

Resources and further reading
The majority of Treadwell's works are stored at the University of Arizona Library Special Collections and the rest at The Billy Rose Theatre Collection at the New York Public Library. The rights to Treadwell's works were passed on in her will to the Roman Catholic Diocese of Tucson:  A Corporation Sole. One who wishes to obtain the rights to Treadwell's plays can address an enquiry to: Fiscal and Administrative Services, Diocese of Tucson, PO Box 31, Tucson, AZ 85702. Proceeds earned from the production or printing of Treadwell's works are used to benefit Native American children in Arizona.

Further biographical information and critical analysis about Treadwell may be found in:
 "Broadway's Bravest Woman: Selected Writings of Sophie Treadwell". Edited and with introductions by Jerry Dickey and Miriam Lopez-Rodiriguez. Southern Illinois University Press, 2006.
 "Susan Glaspell and Sophie Treadwell". Barbara Ozieblo and Jerry Dickey. Routledge, 2008.
 
All of Treadwell's plays are published electronically in "North American Women's Drama" through the academic database publisher Alexander Street Press. Access to this resource is available by purchase directly through ASP's website, or through library access at many academic institutions that have purchased a license to the database.

In addition, Machinal is (or was) included in the following anthologies:
 Twenty-Five Best Plays of the Modern American Theatre by John Glassner- now out of print, originally published in 1949
 Plays by American Women: 1900–1930 Judith Barlow's anthology, published in 1981
 Norton Anthology of Drama
 North American women's Drama
 The Routledge Drama Anthology and Sourcebook
 Plays and performance texts by women 1880-1930 Manchester University Press

References

External links

 The Sophie Treadwell Collection
 North American Women's Drama, Alexander Street
 The Literary Encyclopedia Article, Sophie Treadwell
 

Expressionist dramatists and playwrights
Modernist theatre
1885 births
1970 deaths
Writers from Stockton, California
American women dramatists and playwrights
20th-century American actresses
American actresses of Mexican descent
American people of Spanish descent
American people of Scottish descent
American women journalists
20th-century American dramatists and playwrights
20th-century American women writers
Journalists from California
People from Newtown, Connecticut
20th-century American non-fiction writers